Nephelographa is a genus of moth in the family Lecithoceridae. It contains the species Nephelographa panni, which is found in Afghanistan.

References

Natural History Museum Lepidoptera genus database

Torodorinae
Monotypic moth genera